George Seabo (July 2, 1911 - February 26, 1991) was an American jockey and trainer of Thoroughbred racehorses best known as a founding member of the Jockeys' Guild who rode future U.S. Racing Hall of Fame inductee Challedon to victory in the 1939 Preakness Stakes, the second leg of the U.S. Triple Crown series.

Background
Born in Croton-on-Hudson, New York, George Seabo grew up in Hastings-on-Hudson, New York. He married Mildred Ryan of Roxbury, New York who gave up her job as Branch Manager of a cooperative bank to be a housewife. In a May 28, 1942 interview with The Hastings News she recounted how her husband could ride at 105 pounds and was a rarity among jockeys in that he never had to diet.

Training career
The 1959 American Champion Two-Year-Old Filly My Dear Girl was initially trained by Melvin Calvert's assistant George Seabo but after the filly won the 1959 Florida Breeders' Stakes, Calvert took charge.

References

1911 births
1991 deaths
American jockeys
People from Croton-on-Hudson, New York